Radical: Taking Back Your Faith from the American Dream is a 2010 Christian book written by David Platt, and is a New York Times Bestseller.

Reception

Radical is an Evangelical Christian Publishers Association bestseller.

Publishers Weekly said, 
WaterBrook Multnomah Publishing Group’s Radical: Taking Back Your Faith from the American Dream by David Platt, is now in its 14th print run, with 250,000 copies in print. Since its May 4 publication date, Radical has been on the New York Times Paperback Advice list for eight weeks, reaching #5. The book also has appeared on the CBA Top 50 bestsellers list at #3 and at #2 on the CBA Christian Living list

External links
 Radical book Official Site

References

Evangelical Christian literature
2010 non-fiction books